Batam, the largest city in Riau Islands, is home to several high-rise buildings. The majority of the city's high-rises are located in Nagoya neighbourhood. Throughout the 2010s, Batam experienced massive real estate development ranging from high-rise buildings into skyscrapers.

Tallest completed and topped out buildings
This list is based on The Skyscraper Centre, as of May 2019. This list may also include data from other sources.

 Year : Year of completion
 = : Equal height

Proposed, on hold, and under construction buildings shown
This list is based on The Skyscraper Centre, as of May 2019. This list may also include data from other sources.

 Year : Year of estimated completion
 = : Equal height

See also
 List of tallest buildings in Indonesia

References

External links
 The Skyscraper Centre - Batam, Indonesia

Batam
Buildings and structures in the Riau Islands
Batam